Hands flying off toward the constellations is a painting by Joan Miró dated 19 January 1974. It is now shown at the Fundació Joan Miró, in Barcelona. The artist gave the work to the Foundation in the same month that it opened to the public on 10 June 1975.

Background
Rosa Maria Malet says of these works: 

As for the technical execution Miró explains himself (as Taillandier reported in 1974)

Exhibitions
 1974. Paris. Grand Palais.
 1975. Barcelona. Foundation.

The exhibition L'escala de l'evasió that opened in October 2011 was supported by access to Wikipedia using QRpedia codes that allowed access to visitors in Catalan, English and several other languages.

References

Further reading
 
 
 
 
 
 
 

1974 paintings
Paintings by Joan Miró
Paintings in Barcelona